Frontiers is an eight-part BBC television series, and accompanying book, that explored the geographic boundaries between countries.  Eight writers and journalists in a variety of countries investigated the economic, political, geographical and historical reasons that account for why people are divided.  The series was aired in 1989, just a few months before the fall of the Berlin Wall, which was featured in one episode.

Episodes 
 "Natural Break": Frederic Raphael explored the Pyrenees, the frontier between France and Spain, which at the time was preparing to join the (then) European Economic Community. 
 "Gone Tomorrow": John Wells covered the Iron Curtain that split East and West Germans. 
 "Gold and the Gun": Nadine Gordimer visited the war-torn border area between Mozambique and her native South Africa. 
 "Night and Day": Richard Rodriguez showed how the rich North and poor South converged at the US/Mexican border.
 "Long Division": Ronald Eyre looked at the people living on both sides of the border in Ireland that splits the Republic from Ulster.
 "Big Brother's Bargain": Nigel Hamilton hiked up the boundary between Russia and Finland. 
 "Border Run": Jon Swain visited the Thai/Cambodian border where thousands of Cambodian refugees had been stranded for over ten years. 
 "Cyprus: Stranded in Time": Christopher Hitchens investigated the divided island of Cyprus.

Further reading
 Frontiers, published in 1990 by BBC Books,

External links

1989 British television series debuts
1989 British television series endings
1980s British documentary television series
BBC television documentaries
Borders
British documentary television series
English-language television shows